Mattia Viti (born 24 January 2002) is an Italian professional footballer who plays as a centre-back for  club Nice.

Early life 
Born in Borgo San Lorenzo, in the province of Florence, Mattia Viti already played football at the age of 4, with the club of Ponte a Greve—that would later merge with Rondinella Marzocco—in the Tuscan capital. Having moved to the nearby Audace Legnaia, he joined the Empoli academy as a 8 years old, in 2010.

Club career

Empoli
After a full 2019–20 season with the Primavera, Viti made his professional debut on the 30 September 2020, starting a 2–1 Coppa Italia win against Renate. He played his first Serie B game with Empoli on the 9 April 2021, replacing Nedim Bajrami in a 1–0 away win to Reggina, already proving to be decisive with a late minute goal line clearance. His side eventually won the championship, making their come-back in Italy's top flight, while the Primavera squad also won their championship.

On 22 September 2021 he made his Serie A debut in a 0–2 away victory against Cagliari, with Aurelio Andreazzoli making him start and finish the game, as the youngster proved to be instrumental in keeping a clean sheet for the Azzurri.

During the following months—despite having to face the loss of his mother in November 2021—he became a regular with the first team, alternating with Sebastiano Luperto or the veterans Tonelli and Romagnoli. He was a starter for several important Serie A wins, against the likes of Bologna, Sassuolo or Udinese, appearing as one of the Italian championship most promising young defenders.

Nice
On 3 August 2022, Viti joined Ligue 1 side Nice on a permanent deal for an undisclosed fee, believed to be in the region of  €13 million.

International career 
Mattia Viti is a youth international for Italy, having played at under-15, under-16 and under-18 levels.

In September 2021, he was selected with the under-20, making his debut during a 1–0 away friendly win against Serbia on the 6 September and becoming a regular starter for the team in November, before being promoted to the under-21 side, where he was however forced to withdraw due to injury.

Style of play 
A left-footed center-back with a good physical presence, he is seen as a technically gifted defender, able to launch offensive movements from the back, who doesn't hesitate to take risks and dribble to move froward.

Proactive in putting pressure on the opponent, he has a good discipline—not having received a single card during his first 6 months in Serie A—but still does his far share of defensive tasks, as he was for example among the top 1% of center backs in the top 5 European leagues in therms of blocks, halfway through his first Serie A season.

Very soon compared to former Empoli star Daniele Rugani, his profile is often associated with the one of Alessandro Bastoni.  He cites Sergio Ramos and Paolo Maldini as his main inspirations as a player.

Career statistics

Club

Honours 
Empoli

 Serie B: 2020–21

References

External links
 
 
 

2002 births
People from Borgo San Lorenzo
Sportspeople from the Metropolitan City of Florence
Footballers from Tuscany
Living people
Italian footballers
Italy youth international footballers
Association football central defenders
Empoli F.C. players
OGC Nice players
Serie A players
Serie B players
Italian expatriate footballers
Expatriate footballers in France
Italian expatriate sportspeople in France